Honky Tonk Man is the third album by pioneer country rock musician Steve Young, although this album has more of a straight country sound.

Track listing
All tracks composed by Steve Young; except where indicated
"Honky Tonk Man"  (Johnny Horton, Howard Hausey, Tilman Franks) - 2:23
"Brain Cloudy Blues"  (Bob Wills, Tommy Duncan) - 4:48
"Rock Salt & Nails"  (Utah Phillips) - 3:58
"Rockin' Chair Money"  (Bill Carlisle, Lonnie Glosson) - 2:37
"Ramblin' Man"  (Hank Williams) - 3:44
"The Night They Drove Old Dixie Down"  (Robbie Robertson) - 5:15
"Traveling Kind" - 3:01
"Sally Goodin'"  (Traditional) - 2:12
"Alabama Highway" - 4:57
"Vision of a Child" - 3:30
"We've Been Together on This Earth Before" - 3:13
"The White Trash Song" - 3:46

Personnel
Steve Young - guitar, vocals
Cal Hand - steel guitar, dobro, vocals
Mark Henley - harmonica
Stephen Powers - vocals
Betsy Kaske - vocals

Production
Producer: Stephen Powers
Recording Engineer: Paul Martinson

References

Steve Young (musician) albums
1975 albums
Rounder Records albums